Eldon Miller (born June 19, 1939) is an American college basketball coach. The Gnadenhutten, Ohio native has led four different programs in 36 years of coaching: at Wittenberg University (1962–70), Western Michigan University (1971–76), Ohio State University (1977–86) and the University of Northern Iowa (1987–98). His overall record is 568–419 and 5–6 in NCAA Division I men's basketball tournament games.

Miller is now an assistant coach for his son, Ben Miller, at the University of North Carolina at Pembroke.

Miller was inducted into the Ohio Basketball Hall of Fame in 2009. He was also inducted into Wittenberg's Athletics Hall of Honor in 1986. In 2015 he was inducted into the Western Michigan University Athletics Hall of Fame.

In 1976 Coach Miller was named the Mid-American Conference Men's Basketball Coach of the year.

Head coaching record

References

External links
 UNC Pembroke profile

1939 births
Living people
American men's basketball coaches
American men's basketball players
Basketball coaches from Ohio
Basketball players from Ohio
College men's basketball head coaches in the United States
Northern Iowa Panthers men's basketball coaches
Ohio State Buckeyes men's basketball coaches
People from Tuscarawas County, Ohio
UNC Pembroke Braves basketball coaches
Western Michigan Broncos men's basketball coaches
Wittenberg Tigers men's basketball coaches
Wittenberg Tigers men's basketball players